Astridia dinteri is a species of plant in the family Aizoaceae. It was named in 1961.

References

dinteri
Taxa named by Louisa Bolus